Koerberiella is a genus of lichenized fungi within the Lecideaceae family.

The genus name of Koerberiella is in honour of Gustav Wilhelm Körber (1817–1885), who was a German lichenologist.

The genus was circumscribed by Berthold Stein in  Krypt. Fl. Schlesien vol.2 (issue 2) on page 143 in 1879.

References

External links
Koerberiella at Index Fungorum

Lecideales genera
Lichen genera
Lecideales